The Bayan Lepas LRT line is a proposed light rapid transit (LRT) line in the Malaysian state of Penang. Conceived by the Penang state government in the 2000s as part of the Penang Transport Master Plan (PTMP), the proposed  line within the city of George Town was envisioned to link the city centre with the industrial town of Bayan Lepas to the south.

Nineteen stations are expected to be built along the  stretch.

In 2015, the construction of the LRT line was announced to begin in 2018. That did not happen. Construction was then expected to start in 2020, and that did not happen again. No construction has begun as of 2022. Significant delays in actually constructing the line has been attributed to political feuds for funding between the Penang state government and the federal government of Malaysia.

Overview 
The Bayan Lepas LRT line forms the backbone of the Penang Transportation Master Plan, a comprehensive proposal formulated by the Penang state government to improve transportation within the State of Penang. Among the components of the plan, the LRT line is being prioritised by the state authorities for implementation, as the line will serve a densely populated urban and industrial corridor along the eastern coast of Penang Island, specifically between George Town proper and Bayan Lepas to the south. In addition, the LRT service would facilitate easier commute for tourists arriving via the Penang International Airport in Bayan Lepas.

History 
SRS Consortium, a joint venture consisting of Gamuda Berhad, Ideal Property Development Sdn Bhd and Loh Phoy Yen Holdings, was appointed as the Project Delivery Partner (PDP) in 2015. Within the same year, the first public consultation session on the alignment of the proposed route was held. Following the sessions, the route was finalised and 27 stations identified; the eight southernmost stations will be built on three islets which will be reclaimed to the south of Penang Island. Much of the line will be elevated to reduce land acquisition and to preclude the relocation of underground utilities.

As public transportation falls under the purview of the Malaysian federal government, the proposal was submitted to the Federal Land Public Transport Commission (SPAD) by April 2016 for approval by the federal authorities. However, a political feud between the Pakatan Harapan-led Penang state government and the federal government at the time, which was dominated by Barisan Nasional, led to delays in securing the required federal approval.

On 20 June 2020, chairman of the State Works Committee Zairil Khir Johari said that the LRT would continue, with or without the Federal government as it was funded through the land reclamation.

Pre-qualification exercise for identifying suitable contractors started from Jul 25, 2022 to Aug 19, 2022 and was further extended to Oct 7, 2022. A total of 45 contractor companies registered interested and purchased pre-qualification documents, the State Works Committee received 8 submissions from local and international consortiums as of Oct 7, 2022. The committee will identify suitable contractors to participate in the request for proposal (RFP) tender process which is expected open in early 2023.

The Penang state government plans to start the construction by end of 2023.

Stations

See also
 Transport in Penang

References

External links
Penang Transport Master Plan

Penang Integrated Transportation Masterplan
Rail transport in Penang
Proposed rail infrastructure in Malaysia